4-Methoxyestrone (4-ME1) is an endogenous, naturally occurring methoxylated catechol estrogen and metabolite of estrone that is formed by catechol O-methyltransferase via the intermediate 4-hydroxyestrone. It has estrogenic activity similarly to estrone and 4-hydroxyestrone.

See also
 2-Methoxyestradiol
 2-Methoxyestriol
 2-Methoxyestrone
 4-Methoxyestradiol

References

Phenols
Estranes
Estrogens
Ethers
Human metabolites
Ketones
Steroid hormones